is a Japanese shōjo/josei manga magazine published by Kodansha. It began as a new shōjo magazine in 1996 after the demise of Shōjo Friend. The series that were still ongoing in Shōjo Friend were then moved to Dessert or The Dessert.


Serializations

Current
My Boyfriend in Orange (2016)
A Condition Called Love (2017)
A Sign of Affection (2019)
In the Clear Moonlit Dusk (2020)
And Yet, You Are So Sweet (2020)
How I Met My Soulmate (2021)
Hikaeme ni Itte mo, Kore wa Ai (2021)
Museru Kurai no Ai wo Ageru (2022)
Bokura no Suki wa Warikirenai (2023)

Past
Confidential Confessions (2000–2002)
Boys Esté (2003–2007)
Liar × Liar (2010–2017)
Say I Love You (2008–2017)
My Little Monster (2008–2013)
House of the Sun (2010–2015)
Real Girl (2011–2016)
Waiting for Spring (2014–2019)
Our Precious Conversations (2015–2019)
Lovesick Ellie (2015–2020)
Living-Room Matsunaga-san (2016–2021)
Backflip!! (2021)
You Got Me, Sempai! (2016-2020)

Related magazines
 Aria
 Bessatsu Friend
 Nakayoshi
 Shojo Friend

References

External links 
 Official website of Dessert

1996 establishments in Japan
Josei manga magazines
Magazines established in 1996
Magazines published in Tokyo
Shōjo manga magazines
Monthly manga magazines published in Japan